Oldřiška Pěkná (born 19 September 1950) is a Czech rower. She competed in the women's coxless pair event at the 1976 Summer Olympics.

References

External links

1950 births
Living people
Czech female rowers
Olympic rowers of Czechoslovakia
Rowers at the 1976 Summer Olympics
Rowers from Prague